Robert Mintz (April 4, 1897 – May 9, 1971) was a producer of the Frank Buck film serial Jungle Menace.

Early years
Robert Mintz was the son of Aaron Mintz, a men's clothing merchant, and Ray Mintz, Russian immigrants. He was born and grew up in New York City.

Career
In 1934, Mintz's company, Exploitation Pictures, produced the Exploitation film Enlighten Thy Daughter (alternate title Blind Fools), starring Claire Whitney and Charles Eaton. At the same time, Mintz formed a partnership with Louis Weiss to film direct adaptations of Broadway productions. Two of their films were Drums O' Voodoo (1934) and Before Morning.

Work with Frank Buck
In 1937, Mintz and Weiss produced the Frank Buck serial Jungle Menace.

Later life
Mintz worked as a theater manager, according to the 1940 US Census. He died in New York City aged 74.

References

1897 births
1971 deaths
Film producers from New York (state)
Businesspeople from New York City
20th-century American businesspeople